Pseudozonaria arabicula, common name : the little Arabian cowry, is a species of sea snail, a cowry, a marine gastropod mollusk in the family Cypraeidae, the cowries.

Description
The shell size varies between 13 mm and 37 mm. The dorsum surface is usually dark brown or greyish, while the base is whitish or pale brown, with large dark brown or blackish spots on the ventral margin.

Distribution
This species occurs in the Pacific Ocean along the Galapagos Islands and from Baja California to Peru. A record of this species from Kenya likely stems from a confusion with Mauritia arabica (syn. Cypraea arabica).

References

External links
 Flmnh

Cypraeidae
Gastropods described in 1811